Krivets is a rural locality (a settlement) in Sudskoye Rural Settlement, Cherepovetsky District, Vologda Oblast, Russia. The population was 396 as of 2002. There are 5 streets.

Geography 
Vladimirovka is the nearest rural locality.

References 

Rural localities in Cherepovetsky District